The Kražiai College was a Jesuit college (equivalent to a modern secondary school) in Kražiai, Grand Duchy of Lithuania and later Russian Empire. Established in 1616 in hopes to educate new generations of anti-Protestants, the college was one of the major cultural and educational centers in Samogitia. In 1620–1742, it shared premises with the Samogitian Priest Seminary. In 1844, the college was transferred to Kaunas.

History

Establishment
Bishop Merkelis Giedraitis raised the idea of establishing a college in Kražiai, the first higher education institution in Samogitia. To that end, in 1608, he invited the Jesuits, bought them land and built a house for their needs. Merkelis died the following year; in his last will, he left money and land for the construction of a Jesuit monastery. Other patrons included Mikołaj Krzysztof "the Orphan" Radziwiłł who donated a palace, built in 1565, and Jan Karol Chodkiewicz who donated seven homesteads. The college was founded in 1613, and was called Collegium Chodkievicianum in honor of Chodkiewicz. The first class was held only in September 1616 in a temporary wooden house. The construction of a permanent school began in 1618 (the ceremony of laying the cornerstone was attended by Grand Treasurer Hieronim Wołłowicz). At the time, the college already had about 50 students and 12 teachers.

Growth and reorganizations

Gradually, with the support of many wealthy sponsors, the college expanded into a large campus, including its own church built in 1625–89. Full financial support was given to 26 impoverished students. On average, the school employed 30–50 Jesuits and educated 250–300 students. The curriculum and teaching methods followed the Ratio Studiorum. Students belonged to the Sodality of Our Lady and visited the sick. The college had its own student theater (30 performances are known) and a rich library, which in 1803 held 3,264 volumes (oldest dating back to 1427).

The college suffered severe human and capital losses during the Swedish invasion of 1656 and the plague of 1710, but recovered. After the suppression of the Jesuits in 1773, the college's administration was taken over by the Commission of National Education. After the Third Partition of the Polish–Lithuanian Commonwealth, Carmelites from Kolainiai administered the school from 1797 to 1817. In 1817, Tsarist authorities secularized the school, changed its name to gymnasium, introduced primary education classes, and transferred its administration to Vilnius University. As such, the number of students grew and exceeded 400.

Move to Kaunas
Vilnius University was closed in the aftermath of the 1831 November Uprising. After the establishment of the Kovno Governorate in 1843, the gymnasium was transferred from Kražiai to Kaunas (the present-day Maironis Gymnasium). The campus in Kražiai was abandoned and fell into ruins. Only the former student dormitory (bursa) survives to this day. The building was extensively renovated in 2008 and houses the Cultural Center of M. K. Sarbievijus, Kražiai Region Museum, and the library and art collection of Charlotte Narkiewicz-Laine.

Teachers and students
The first teacher, Jonas Kochas, was sent from the Collegium Hosianum in Royal Prussia. Among the first teachers was poet Maciej Kazimierz Sarbiewski who taught syntax. Other notable teachers included historian Albert Wijuk Kojałowicz who taught rhetoric, taught philosophy Adam Krupski in 1740–1742, Žygimantas Liauksminas (Sigismundus Lauxmin) who was also college's rector, and future Bishop Motiejus Valančius. Notable students included writers Dionizas Poška and Simonas Stanevičius, folklorists Liudvikas Adomas Jucevičius, explorers Jan Prosper Witkiewicz, brothers Antanas and Jonas Juška.

See also
 List of Jesuit sites

References

Kražiai College
1616 establishments in the Polish–Lithuanian Commonwealth
1844 disestablishments
Former universities and colleges of Jesuits
Universities and colleges in the Polish–Lithuanian Commonwealth
History of education in Lithuania
Educational institutions established in the 1610s
Educational institutions disestablished in 1844